Sedin Dujone is a 2008 Bengali film directed by debutant director Atanu Basu and released in 2008 featuring Amitava Bhattacharya and Kasturi. The film is almost directly from Priyadarshan directed Kyon Ki released in 2005, which was not an original storyline either. It was a variation on the famous Suchitra Sen-film Deep Jele Jai. This was later made into Hindi as Khamoshi, produced by Hemant Kumar and starring Waheeda Rehman. But like most of his peers, Bose does not credit his source.

Plot
The focus is on hero Raj (Amitabh Bhattacharya) and not so much on the two heroines Maria (Kasturi) and Sanchita (Kanchana Moitra). Raj is a famous singer when the film opens. He falls in love with Maria, a Catholic nun-to-be and the two are engaged. Just before they tie the knot, Raj's friend Suman steps in stealthily with the intention of raping her. Maria jumps to her death and Raj loses his sanity.

The post-interval phase of the mental care home begins the second part of the story where the home's dictatorial proprietor's daughter Sanchita cures Raj. They fall in love and the two could have walked into the sunset with a good end to the film. But the director had other plans and his debut goes almost the Kyon Ki way.

Cast
 Amitava Bhattacharya – Raj
 Kasturi – Maria
 Kanchana Moitra – Sanchita
 Diganta Bagchi – Suman
 Biplab Chattopadhyay – Dr. Roy
 Monu Mukherjee – Kaka
 Kunal Mitra – Bijay
 Partha Sarathi Deb
 Manoj Mitra

References

External links
www.telegraphindia.com
www.screenindia.com
sify.com/movies
 

2008 films
Bengali-language Indian films
2000s Bengali-language films